USS Wego (SP-1196), also spelled We-go and We Go, was a United States Navy patrol vessel in commission from 1917 to 1918.

Wego was built as a private wooden-hulled motorboat of the same name by the Camden Anchor Rockland Machine Company at Camden, Maine. In 1917, the U.S. Navy acquired her under a free lease from her owner, Mrs. R. B. Fuller of New York City, for use as a section patrol boat during World War I. Wego was listed as "delivered and commissioned" as of 9 August 1917 as USS Wego, We-go, or We Go (SP-1196).

Apparently assigned to the 1st Naval District in northern New England, Wego served on local patrol duties. She was returned to her owner on 1 October 1918.

Notes

References

SP-1196 We Go at Department of the Navy Naval History and Heritage Command Online Library of Selected Images: U.S. Navy Ships -- Listed by Hull Number "SP" #s and "ID" #s -- World War I Era Patrol Vessels and other Acquired Ships and Craft numbered from SP-1100 through SP-1199
NavSource Online: Section Patrol Craft Photo Archive Wego (SP 1196)

Patrol vessels of the United States Navy
World War I patrol vessels of the United States
Ships built in Camden, Maine